Evelyn Opela (born 4 February 1945 in Warnsdorf Sudetenland now Varnsdorf, Czech Republic) is a German television actress.

Since 1986 she has been married to German television film producer Helmut Ringelmann. She lives in Munich.

Selected filmography

Movies
1971: Morgen fällt die Schule aus
1972: Betragen ungenügend!
1973: Pan
1973: Hubertus Castle
1976: Silence in the Forest
1993: Night Train to Venice

TV
1970:  (The False Weight)
1971: Nasrin oder Die Kunst zu träumen
1972: Der Amateur
1973: 
1974: Commenius
1976: Das Blaue Palais: Unsterblichkeit
1977: Die Rückkehr des alten Herrn
1979: Das ewig Menschliche
1984: Der Besuch
1984: Derrick - Season 11, Episode 11: "Gangster haben andere Spielregeln" (Gangsters play differently)
1985: Goldene Zeiten – Bittere Zeiten
1991: Derrick - Season 18, Folge 205: "Das Lächeln des Doktor Bloch"

and TV series including Das Traumschiff, Tatort, The Old Fox, Der Mann ohne Schatten, SOKO 5113

Theater
Das Vergnügen, anständig zu sein (Düsseldorfer Schauspielhaus)
Der Kammersänger (Düsseldorfer Schauspielhaus)
Der Meteor (Theater in der Josefstadt, Vienna)
Der Mann, das Tier und die Tugend (Tournee)
Zwei Damen zuviel (Tournee)

External links
 
 Jovanovic Agency Munich 

1945 births
Living people
People from Varnsdorf
German television actresses
German film actresses
20th-century German actresses
Sudeten German people